The Ukrainian People's Party is a political party in Ukraine, registered on Old Year's Day 1999 as the Ukrainian National Movement.

History
At the legislative elections in Ukraine, 30 March 2002, the Ukrainian National Movement was part of the Viktor Yushchenko Bloc Our Ukraine.

In January 2003 it changed the name to "Ukrainian People's Party" to avoid being confused with People's Movement of Ukraine, out of which it was originally split.

At the legislative elections in Ukraine, 26 March 2006, the party was part of the Ukrainian National Bloc of Kostenko and Plyushch.

In the parliamentary elections on 30 September 2007, the party was part of the Our Ukraine alliance, that won 72 out of 450 seats.

In the 2010 local elections the party won a few representative in regional parliaments.

The party announced it will be merged into Our Ukraine in December 2011. This process started mid-December 2011. It was the plan that the parties would be unificated in February 2012. But by February 2013 Ukrainian People's Party was still an independent party.

The party competed on one single party under "umbrella" party Our Ukraine in the 2012 Ukrainian parliamentary election, together with Congress of Ukrainian Nationalists; this list won 1.11% of the national votes and no constituencies and thus failed to win parliamentary representation. The party itself had competed in 34 constituencies and lost in all.

The party congress approved a merge with People's Movement of Ukraine in May 2013. However, a section of the party did not merge and continued the parties activities under the leadership of Oleksandr Ivanovych Klymenko.

In the 2014 Ukrainian parliamentary election the participated in 8 constituencies; but its candidates lost in all of them and thus the party won no parliamentary seats.

In the 2020 Ukrainian local elections, the party saw a total of 30 members elected to any level of political office across Ukraine.

In 2021, Yuri Kostenko was reelected as party leader.

Results

References

External links
 Ukrainian People's Party official site
 Narodne Slovo party newspaper

1999 establishments in Ukraine
Conservative parties in Ukraine
National conservative parties
Nationalist parties in Ukraine
Political parties established in 1999
Pro-European political parties in Ukraine
Social conservative parties